Ancylis paludana is a butterfly belonging to the family Tortricidae. The species was first described by Charles Golding Barrett in 1871.

It is native to Europe.

References

Enarmoniini